This is a list of Belgian television related events from 1958.

Events

Debuts

Television shows

Ending this year

Births
8 December - Greet Rouffaer, actress

Deaths